The Pawtucket Indians were a minor league baseball team affiliated with the Cleveland Indians. Located in Pawtucket, Rhode Island, the Pawtucket Indians existed from 1966 to 1967, playing in the Eastern League. They came into existence after 1965, when the Reading Indians moved to Pawtucket. They played their home games at McCoy Stadium. Despite compiling losing records in each of its two years of existence, the Indians drew 74,500 fans in 1966 and almost 61,500 in 1967, each time finishing second in attendance in the Eastern League.

Notable alumni

Ted Ford
Fran Healy
Mike Hedlund
Tom Kelley

Eddie Leon
Dave Nelson
Richie Scheinblum
Oscar Zamora

Year-by-year record

Cleveland Guardians minor league affiliates
Defunct Eastern League (1938–present) teams
Baseball teams established in 1966
Professional baseball teams in Rhode Island
Baseball teams disestablished in 1967
1966 establishments in Rhode Island
1967 disestablishments in Rhode Island
Defunct baseball teams in Rhode Island